Rivula curvifera is a moth of the family Erebidae first described by Francis Walker in 1862. It is found in Australia, China, Japan (Honshu, Shikoku, Kyushu, Tsushima Island), Taiwan and on the Korean Peninsula.

The wingspan is 7–9 mm.

References

"Species Rivula curvifera (Walker, 1862)". Australian Faunal Directory. Archived 9 October 2012.

Moths of Australia
Moths of Japan
Moths of Korea
Moths of Taiwan
Moths described in 1862
Rivulinae
Moths of Asia